Undal is a former municipality that was located in the old Vest-Agder county in Norway.  The  municipality existed from 1838 until its dissolution in 1845. It encompassed parts of the present-day municipalities of Lyngdal and Lindesnes.  The municipality encompassed most of the Audnedalen valley which follows the river Audna southwards to the sea.

Name
The first element is the genitive case of the river name  (now Audna) and the last element is dalr which means "valley" or "dale". The river name is derived from the Old Norse word  which means "destruction" (because of flooding). (Around 1900, the name Undal was Norwegianized to Audnedal.)

History
The parish of Undal was established as a municipality on 1 January 1838 (see formannskapsdistrikt law). The municipality was short-lived and it existed only until 1845, when it was divided into the new municipalities of Nordre Undal (population: 802) in the north and Søndre Undal (population: 3,893) in the south. Prior to the split Undal had a population of 4,695.

See also
List of former municipalities of Norway

References

Lyngdal
Lindesnes
Former municipalities of Norway
1838 establishments in Norway
1845 disestablishments in Norway